The 2019 NCAA Division I Outdoor Track and Field Championships was the 98th NCAA Division I Men's Outdoor Track and Field Championships and the 38th NCAA Division I Women's Outdoor Track and Field Championships held at Mike A. Myers Stadium in Austin, Texas on the campus of the University of Texas at Austin. In total, forty-two different men's and women's track and field events was contested from Wednesday, June 5 to Saturday, June 8, 2019.

Schedule

Results

Men's events

Men's 100 meters

Wind: +0.8

Men's 200 meters
Wind: +0.8

Men's 400 meters

Men's 800 meters

Men's 1500 meters

Men's 5000 meters

Men's 10,000 meters

Men's 110-meter hurdles

Wind: +0.8

Men's 400-meter hurdles

Men's 3000-meter steeplechase

Men's 4 x 100-meter relay

Men's 4 x 400-meter relay

Men's high jump

Men's pole vault

Men's long jump

Men's triple jump

Men's shot put

Men's discus throw

Men's javelin throw

Men's hammer throw

Decathlon

Women's events

Women's 100 meters

Wind: +1.6

Women's 200 meters
Wind: +1.3

Women's 400 meters

Women's 800 meters

Women's 1500 meters

Women's 5000 meters

Women's 10,000 meters

Women's 100-meter hurdles
Wind: +0.6

Women's 400-meter hurdles

Women's 3000-meter steeplechase

Women's 4 x 100-meter relay

Women's 4 x 400-meter relay

Women's high jump

Women's pole vault

Women's long jump

Women's triple jump

Women's shot put

Women's discus throw

Women's javelin throw

Women's hammer throw

Heptathlon

Standings

Men
 Only top ten teams shown

Women
 Only top ten teams shown

See also
 NCAA Men's Division I Outdoor Track and Field Championships
 NCAA Women's Division I Outdoor Track and Field Championships

References

External links
 Results

NCAA Division I Outdoor Track and Field Championships
NCAA Division I Outdoor Track and Field Championships
NCAA Men's Outdoor Track and Field Championship
NCAA Women's Outdoor Track and Field Championship